Honrarás a los tuyos is a Mexican telenovela produced by Guillermo Diazayas for Televisa in 1979.

Cast 
Irma Lozano as Toña
Enrique Novi as Alejandro
Gloria Marín as Beatriz
Alicia Montoya as Vicenta
Viridiana Alatriste as Silvia
José Ángel Espinosa as Miguel
Mónica Prado as Martha
Alicia del Lago as Clara
Martha Ofelia Galindo as Concha 
Ana Patricia Rojo as Sofía (child)

References

External links 

Mexican telenovelas
1979 telenovelas
Televisa telenovelas
Spanish-language telenovelas
1979 Mexican television series debuts
1979 Mexican television series endings